= Los Angeles County Museum =

Los Angeles County Museum may refer to:

- Natural History Museum of Los Angeles County
- Los Angeles County Museum of Art
